The Battle Creek Custers were a Michigan–Ontario League baseball team based in Battle Creek, Michigan, USA that played from 1919 to 1920. Notable players include Johnnie Heving, Trader Horne, Clarence Winters and Jim Wright.

References

Baseball teams established in 1919
Sports clubs disestablished in 1920
Defunct minor league baseball teams
Sports in Battle Creek, Michigan
Defunct baseball teams in Michigan
Baseball teams disestablished in 1920
Michigan-Ontario League teams